Jon Stephen Jost (born 16 May 1943 in Chicago) is an American independent filmmaker.

Born in Chicago to a military family, he grew up in Georgia, Kansas, Japan, Italy, Germany and Virginia. He began making films in January 1963 after being expelled from college. In 1965 he was imprisoned by US authorities for 2 years and 3 months for refusal to cooperate with the Selective Service system. On his release, he became engaged in anti-war activities primarily by working for the draft resistance, Chicago Mobilization, and helped found the Chicago branch of what became Newsreel, the New Left Film production and distribution group.

Career

Self-taught as a filmmaker, he made his first full-length film in 1974, and has since that time focused on a wide range of American issues in his films, at present having made 40 long-form films. Jost's work has shown since 1976 in major film festivals around the world. The Museum of Modern Art, NYC, screened a complete retrospective of his work from January 18 to February 19, 1991. This program was completely repeated at the UCLA Film Archive, Los Angeles, (March–April), and partially repeated at the American Film Institute Film Theater at the J.F. Kennedy Center, Washington, DC, (February), the Kabuki Theater in San Francisco under the sponsorship of the Film Arts Foundation and San Francisco Film Society, (March–April), and the Harvard Film Archive, Boston, (April). In October, 1991, the Viennale, in Vienna, Austria, in the context of a broader festival, screened a complete retrospective of Jost's films. It was also screened in January–February 1992 at the Arsenal Kino, Berlin. 

In 1994 the Bergamo Film Meeting, Italy, organised a complete retrospective of all features and short films, and published a book and catalog on Mr. Jost and his work. A traveling retrospective was done in the Netherlands by the Filmtheater Desmet in fall 1994; and in December 1994 a complete retrospective was done at the Cinemateca in Bologna, Italy, and in Feb 1995 it was repeated at the Film Museo Nazionale, in Torino. Full retrospectives were mounted in 1996 at the Cinemateca Portuguese and Filmoteca Espanol. In 2011 the Jerusalem Cinematheque did an 11 film partial retrospective, also shown in Haifa and Tel Aviv.

Since 1996 he has worked almost exclusively in digital video (DV & HD), completing twenty six features and many short films in electronic formats. Two of his most widely known films are All the Vermeers in New York (1990) and The Bed You Sleep In (1993).  His 1977 feature, Last Chants for a Slow Dance is listed in the book 1001 Films You Must See Before You Die.

Jost also works in photography and painting, and writes and plays country western songs.

Personal life

After living and teaching in Seoul for 4 years, Jost resigned as a "Distinguished Professor" from Yonsei University, in June 2011, and resumed full-time filmmaking.
Jost is presently living in Butte, Montana (2020).

Filmography

Feature length films
 Speaking Directly (1973)
 Angel City (1976)
 Last Chants for a Slow Dance (1977)
 Chameleon (16 to 35 mm) (1978)
 Stagefright (1981)
 Slow Moves (1983)
 Bell Diamond (1986)
 Plain Talk & Common Sense (1987)
 Rembrandt Laughing (1988)
 Sure Fire (super16 to 35 mm) (1990)
 All the Vermeers in New York (35 mm) (1990)
 Frameup (35 mm) (1993)
 The Bed You Sleep In (35 mm) (1993)
 Uno a me, uno a te e uno a Raffaele (35 mm) (1994)
 London Brief (DV) (1997)
 Nas Correntes de Luz da Ria Formosa (DV) (1999)
 6 Easy Pieces (DV) (2000)
 Roma - un ritratto improvvisario (DV) (2000)
 Muri romani (DV) (2000)
 Oui Non (DV) (2002)
 Vergessensfuge (DV) (2004)
 Homecoming (DV) (2004)
 Chhattisgarh Sketches (DV) (2004)
 Passages  (DV) (2004)
 La Lunga Ombra (DV) (2005)
 Over Here (DV) (2007)
 Parable (DV)  (2008)
 Rant (DV) (2008)
 Swimming in Nebraska (DV) (2010)
 Imagens de uma cidade perdida (DV) 2011
 Dissonance (DV/HD) 2011
 Trinity (DV/HD) 2011
 The Narcissus Flowers of Katsura-shima (HD) 2012
 Coming to Terms (HD) 2013
 Canyon (HD) 2013
 Bowman Lake (HD) 2014
 They Had It Coming (HD) 2015
 Blue Strait (HD) 2015
 Again & Again (HD) (with Marcella Di Palo Jost) 2012-2018
 Muri Romani II (HD) 2018
 Pequenos Milagres (HD) 2019
 Tourists (HD) 2020

Short films
 My Life as a Midge, 6:28, USA 2020
 Punta Secca, 9:05, ITALY 2020
 The Symphony, 2:02, USA 2020
 The Field, (A Dance),2:38 USA 2020 
 Brambles, 4:45, USA 2020
 Veils, 10:30, USA 2020
 Red Frame, 4:03, USA 2020
 I have a friend who hates windchimes, 1:05 USA 2020
 And a butterfly, 2:50, USA 2020
 July 4, 3:10, USA 2020
 Luminous Landscape, 6:40, USA 2020
 Spectral Passage, 6:30, USA 2020
 Walking the Dogs, 1.40, USA 2020
 On the Strait, 6:40, USA 2020
 Requiem, 13:30, USA 2018
 Landscape for Watanabe Shiko, 13 mins USA 2017
 Stand, 2016, 30 mins, USA
 Canyon, 2013, 24 mins, USA (short version)
 AMTRAK, 2009, 27 mins, USA
 Mr Right, 2009, 30 mins, Seoul S Korea
 San Lorenzo, 2006, 12 mins, Italy
 A View of Mount Baker from Port Angeles, Wa. [For Hokusai], 2004
 A Walk Through Waseda Garden, 2004
 Tanti Auguri, 2002
 FUNKIES - 10 Electronic Paintings,  2003
 Fugue, 2002
 Water Song #2, 2001
 Dharma Does As Dharma Do, 2001
 Vera x 3, 2001
 Til Edvard, 2001
 Adrift, 2001
 Water Song #1, 1998
 Godard 80, 1980
 Beauty Sells Best, 1978
 X2: Two Dances by Nancy Karp, 1980
 Primaries/A Turning Point in Lunatic China/1, 2, 3 Four, 1971
 A Man Is More Than The Sum of His Parts/A Woman Is, 1971
 Fall Creek, 1970
 Canyon, 1970
 Flower, 1970
 Susannah's Film, 1969
 13 Fragments & 3 Narratives from Life, 1968
 Traps, 1967
 Leah, 1967
 Judith, 1965
 We Didn't Go to Unique's, 1965
 City, 1964
 Sunday, 1964
 Chalma, 1964
 Repetition, 1963
 Portrait, 1963

References

External links

Interview with Jon Jost - Documentary Box (Interviewers: Aaron Gerow, Abé Mark Nornes, and Fujiwara Toshifumi)
Jon Jost: The Early Films (1963-1983)

1943 births
Living people
American film directors
Artists from Chicago